The May S. Marcy Sculpture Garden is a sculpture garden featuring 19th- and 20th-century modern and contemporary sculptures, located adjacent to the San Diego Museum of Art's West Wing in San Diego's Balboa Park, in the U.S. state of California.

Works

Featured works include:

 Aim I (Alexander Liberman, 1980)
 Big Open Skull (Jack Zajac, 1966-73)
 Border Crossing/Cruzando el Rio Bravo (Luis Jiménez, 1989)
 Cubi XV (David Smith, 1963-64)
 Figure for Landscape (Barbara Hepworth, 1960)
 Mother and Daughter Seated (Francisco Zúñiga, 1971)
 Night Presence II (Louise Nevelson, 1976)
 Odyssey III (Tony Rosenthal, 1973)
 The Prodigal Son (Auguste Rodin, 1905)
 Reclining Figure: Arch Leg (Henry Moore, 1969)
 Solar Bird (Joan Miró, 1966-67)
 Sonata Primitive (Saul Baizerman, 1940-48)
 Spinal Column (Alexander Calder, 1968)
 Two Lines Oblique: San Diego (George Rickey, 1993)
 The Watchers (Lynn Chadwick, 1960)

References

External links
 

Sculpture gardens, trails and parks in California